Sir William O'Brien Lindsay  (8 October 1909 – 20 October 1975) was the Chief Justice of Anglo-Egyptian Sudan from 1950 or 1954 to 1955, during the period when it was administered as an Anglo-Egyptian condominium. He served in the Sudan Political Service from 1932 to 1955, and later establishing a law firm in Nairobi, Kenya. Lindsay was a talented sportsman as a youth, playing first-class cricket for Oxford University, Scotland and Kent County Cricket Club.

Early life and family
Lindsay was born in Canterbury, Kent, to Elsie Catherine Harriet (née Riddiford) and Michael Egan Lindsay. His parents were both New Zealanders by birth, with his mother being the daughter of Edward Joshua Riddiford and granddaughter of Henry Bunny, both prominent landowners there. However, the couple's four children were all born in the United Kingdom – their father had served with the 1st New Zealand Contingent during the Second Boer War, then transferring to the British Army as an officer with the 7th Dragoon Guards and the Fife and Forfar Yeomanry in World War I. He became a Deputy Lieutenant of Fife.

Sporting career

Like his older brothers, Lindsay was educated at Harrow School. He played for the school cricket team for three years, captaining it in 1928, his final year, when he averaged 55 runs per innings. also representing a combined Public Schools side. He went on to Balliol College, Oxford, and began playing for the Oxford University Cricket Club, making his first-class debut in June 1929, against Gloucestershire. A wicket-keeper and right-handed top-order batsman, Lindsay went on to play three more first-class games during the 1929 season – two for Oxford (against the Free Foresters and Lancashire), and one for Scotland, his father's place of residence. His sole appearance for Scotland came against the touring South African team, which was completed within two days as Scotland lost by an innings.

Lindsay played only once at first-class level during the 1930 season, but the following year made five first-class appearances for Oxford, including in the annual University Match against Cambridge University (played at Lord's). He also made two County Championship appearances for Kent, against Warwickshire and Middlesex within the space of five days. He kept wicket and opened the batting (with Colin Fairservice) against Warwickshire, but Les Ames, the county's usual wicket-keeper, returned against Middlesex, with Lindsay playing solely as a batsman. In 1932, Lindsay played in another five first-class fixtures for the university, and against Lancashire scored 63 runs, his first and only half-century. His season included matches against two touring international teams, the Indians and the South Americans, with his game against the South American composite side being his final first-class match.

Professional career and later life
In 1932, Lindsay joined the Sudan Political Service, which administered Anglo-Egyptian Sudan. During the Second World War, he was twice given an emergency commission as a second lieutenant in the Sudan Defence Force. Towards the war's end, in 1944, Lindsay transferred to the legal department of the civil service. He was appointed to the country's judiciary, as chief justice in 1950 according to one source and 1954 according to another source. He served until 1955, as one of the last British chief justices before the country was given independence in 1956 (Republic of the Sudan). Upon leaving office, he was made a Knight Commander of the Order of the British Empire (KBE) in the 1955 Birthday Honours. After retiring, Lindsay opened a law firm in Nairobi, Kenya, where he lived until his death in 1975 (aged 66). He had married three times – firstly in 1937, to Sevilla Glass Hooper; secondly in 1962, to Elizabeth Doreen Sturman; and thirdly in 1975 (three months before his death), to Michaela Denis (the widow and partner of filmmaker Armand Denis).

References

External links

1909 births
1975 deaths
Anglo-Egyptian Sudan judges
British emigrants to Kenya
British people of New Zealand descent
Cricket players and officials awarded knighthoods
English cricketers
Knights Commander of the Order of the British Empire
Oxford University cricketers
People educated at Harrow School
Scotland cricketers
Settlers of Kenya
Sudan Political Service officers
Kent cricketers
Alumni of Balliol College, Oxford
Sportspeople from Canterbury
British Kenya people
Riddiford family
Sudan Defence Force officers
British Army personnel of World War II
Wicket-keepers